The Men's 400m T38 had its Final held on September 10 at 18:20.

Medalists

Results

References
Final

Athletics at the 2008 Summer Paralympics